Luis Fabián Artime (born December 15, 1965) is an Argentine former professional footballer who played as a forward.

Artime was born in Ramos Mejía, Greater Buenos Aires.  He spent most of his career playing for Belgrano de Córdoba where he is regarded as a club legend and is the all-time leading goalscorer with 91 goals in his career. His father was Luis Artime, a great goalscorer in the 1960s.

Artime was a prolific goalscorer and while playing in Peru, he was the top goalscorer in 2002.

References

External links
 Argentine Primera statistics
 Official Player Website
 Top scorer in Peru

1965 births
Living people
Sportspeople from Buenos Aires Province
Argentine footballers
Association football forwards
Club Atlético Belgrano footballers
Club Atlético Independiente footballers
San Lorenzo de Almagro footballers
Club de Gimnasia y Esgrima La Plata footballers
Club Atlético Tigre footballers
Ferro Carril Oeste footballers
FBC Melgar footballers
Argentine Primera División players
Peruvian Primera División players
Argentine expatriate footballers
Argentine expatriate sportspeople in Peru
Expatriate footballers in Peru